Christopher Anne Templeton (February 26, 1952 – February 15, 2011) was an American film and television actress. She played Carol Robbins Evans on the CBS soap opera The Young and the Restless from 1984 to 1992.

Known early life
Templeton was born in Lake Forest, Illinois, and named after the character of Christopher Robin in the Winnie The Pooh books written by A. A. Milne. She contracted polio at six months. She managed to survive and routinely underwent physical therapy until she was eight years old. In a 1990 interview, Templeton said that when she recovered, she got back 65 percent of movement in her left leg but only 10 percent in her right leg. As a result, she spent the rest of her life with a limp.

Known career
Deciding on an acting career, Templeton traveled to Los Angeles to pursue it. Upon her arrival, she not only faced the same problems as any aspiring actress—a shortage of acting roles and an abundance of competitors for those roles—but also the obstacle of her irreversible disability; she went to her auditions wearing a brace and sometimes carrying a cane. Though her disability would have seemed to spell professional doom in a business where almost "everybody is body beautiful," as she phrased it in an interview she gave in 1984, Templeton persisted. It paid off with her winning several roles in feature films and guest roles on TV dramas. She also played Christine Tate in the episode "Ladybug, Ladybug" of In the Heat of the Night.

In 1983, Templeton began appearing regularly on the CBS daytime serial The Young and the Restless, in the role of Carol Robbins, loyal secretary to Jack Abbott (then Terry Lester, and later Peter Bergman). During a day off from her work on the soap, Templeton spoke to reporter Joseph Levy about the way TV deals with the disabled and the difficulties she faced because of her condition.

Templeton played the role of Robbins for a total of eight years, finally leaving the cast in 1992.  She also made an appearance as Hedda Hatter on Adventures in Wonderland.

Later years and death
After leaving The Young and the Restless, Templeton continued to pursue her career as not only an actress in but also a writer and director of a number of independent films  for the remaining nine years of her life.

Templeton died in San Antonio, Texas, on February 15, 2011, eleven days before she would have reached the age of 59.

Legacy
Templeton was the first known disabled actress to receive many contract roles.

Filmography

References

External links
 
Legacy.com
Tributes.com
Soapcentral.com
Daytimeconfidential.com
Articles.latimes.com
Nytimes.com
Disabled-world.com
Books.google.com
Books.google.com

1952 births
2011 deaths
20th-century American actresses
21st-century American actresses
People from Lake Forest, Illinois
American soap opera actresses
American television actresses
American film actresses
Actresses from Illinois
People with polio